is a branch temple of Higashi Hongan-ji in Hakodate, Hokkaidō, Japan. Rebuilt after a fire in 1907, it is the first temple in Japan built with reinforced concrete. The Hondō (1915), Shōrō (1912–25), and Shōmon (1912–25) have all been designated Important Cultural Properties.

See also
 Japanese Buddhist architecture
 Important Cultural Properties of Japan

References

Buddhist temples in Hokkaido
Residential buildings completed in 1907
Important Cultural Properties of Japan
Shinshū Ōtani-ha temples